Wiltshire Council elections date from 2009, when the Wiltshire Council unitary authority was created.

As a result of the 2009 structural changes to local government in England, the former Wiltshire County Council and the four districts within its geographical area were replaced by Wiltshire Council, a unitary authority covering the same area, with elections continuing to be held every four years. A shadow authority was in place from 2008 and the first elections were held on 4 June 2009, when they coincided with an election to the European Parliament. Previously, Wiltshire County Council had been elected between 1889 and 2005, initially every three years, later every four years.

The unitary authority area has 98 electoral divisions, each electing one councillor. In 2018, the Local Government Boundary Commission for England began the first review of the divisions, on the grounds that in two of them the number of electors deviated from the average by more than 30%. Following consultations, their proposal, enacted by Parliament in March 2020 as the Wiltshire (Electoral Changes) Order 2020 and coming into effect at the 2021 elections, kept the total at 98 but redrew boundaries and renamed divisions in several areas.

Political control
Since the first election to the council in 2009, political control of the council has been held by the following parties:

Leadership
The leaders of the council since the council's creation in 2009 have been:

Jane Scott had been the last leader of the predecessor Wiltshire County Council.

Council elections
2009 Wiltshire Council election
2013 Wiltshire Council election
2017 Wiltshire Council election
2021 Wiltshire Council election (New ward boundaries)

The number of councillors by party was:

County result maps

By-election results
By-elections occur when seats become vacant between council elections. Below is a summary of all by-elections; full by-election results can be found by clicking on the by-election name.

See also
List of electoral divisions and wards in Wiltshire
Wiltshire County Council elections

References

External links
Wiltshire Council

 
Council elections in Wiltshire
Unitary authority elections in England